Ulmus parvifolia 'A. Ross Central Park (selling name ) is a Chinese elm cultivar that is probably the hardiest in cultivation and was patented in 1989 by David F. Karnosky. The original tree grew near the entrance to Central Park, at the junction of Fifth Avenue and 72nd Street in the Upper East Side of Manhattan in New York City, and died in the 1990s aged over 100 years. The cloning project was initiated in 1976 by the Arthur Ross Foundation, and executed by the School of Forestry and Wood Products, Michigan Technological University, Houghton.

Description
 is a medium-size tree rarely exceeding  in height, with a broad, rounded crown. The leaves are glossy green, turning yellow in autumn. The mottled bark, its colour ranging from greyish orange to greyish brown, is considered comparatively dull by some.

Pests and diseases
The species and its cultivars are highly resistant, but not immune, to Dutch elm disease, and completely unaffected by the elm leaf beetle Xanthogaleruca luteola.

Cultivation
 is not known to be in cultivation beyond North America.

Synonymy
'Across Central Park': Dirr, M. A. & Richards, A. E. (1989), Amer. Nurseryman, 169 (3), 1989, in error.

Etymology
The cultivar name is for Arthur Vining Ross.

Accessions

North America
Chicago Botanic Garden, Glencoe, Illinois, US. No details available.
New York Botanical Garden, US. Acc. nos. 301/92, 4732/95

Nurseries

North America

Sun Valley Garden Centre , Eden Prairie, Minnesota, US.

References

External links
http://www.ces.ncsu.edu/depts/hort/consumer/factsheets/trees-new/cultivars/ulmus_parvifolia.htm Ulmus parvifolia cultivar list.
http://fletcher.ces.state.nc.us/programs/nursery/metria/metria11/warren/elm.htm Return of the Elm - the status of elms in the nursery industry in 2000. Warren, K., J. Frank Schmidt and Co.

Chinese elm cultivar
Ulmus articles missing images
Ulmus
Central Park